János Csernoch (Slovak: Ján Černoch) S.T.D. (18 June 1852 – 25 July 1927) was a Cardinal of the Roman Catholic Church and Archbishop of Esztergom and Primate of Hungary.

János Csernoch was born in Szakolcza, Kingdom of Hungary (now Skalica, Slovakia). He received minor orders on 22 July 1874, the subdiaconate on 23 July 1874 and the diaconate on 24 July 1874. He was educated at the Collegium Pázmáneum in Vienna and the University of Vienna, where he earned a doctorate in theology on 2 June 1876.

In spite of his Slovak ethnic origin and family  relations to several Slovak national activists his attitude to the Slovak national movement was ambivalent. He financially supported some Slovak activities and published articles in Slovak newspapers but after 1910 he supported the integrity of the Kingdom of Hungary.

To date, he is the last Archbishop of Esztergom to have crowned a King of Hungary.

Priesthood
He was ordained on 18 November 1874.  He successively held positions, within the Archdiocese of Esztergom, as professor of theology and biblical studies at the Seminary of Esztergom; librarian and archivist of the archiepiscopal palace; secretary to Cardinal János Simor; notary of the Holy See; titular abbot of Savnyik; archiepiscopal chancellor; pastor of the cathedral in 1893 and Royal chaplain to the House of Habsburg in 1887. He was also Deputy in the Parliament of Hungary, representing his native city in 1901. He was created Protonotary apostolic on 15 April 1907.

Episcopate
Appointed as Bishop of Csanád by Pope Pius X on 16 February 1908, he was promoted to the metropolitan see of Kalocsa on 20 April 1911. Around that time he was also a Royal counsellor. He was finally transferred to the metropolitan and primatial Archdiocese of Esztergom by Pope Pius on 13 December 1912.

Cardinalate
Csernoch was created Cardinal-Priest of Sant'Eusebio in the consistory of 25 May 1914 by Pope Pius X.  He received the red biretta from Archduke Franz Ferdinand of Austria (who was to be assassinated in Sarajevo on 28 June 1914). He was decorated with the Grand Cross of the Order of Saint Stephen in 1915. On 30 December 1916, as Primate of Hungary he crowned King Charles IV of Hungary, who was at the same time Charles I of Austria. He participated in the conclave of 1914, which elected Pope Benedict XV, and in that of 1922, which elected Pope Pius XI. He died in office in 1927.

External links

Cardinals of the Holy Roman Church
Catholic Hierarchy data for this cardinal

1852 births
1927 deaths
People from Skalica
Higher Scientific Institute for Diocesan Priests at St. Augustine's alumni
20th-century Hungarian cardinals
Archbishops of Esztergom
Archbishops of Kalocsa
Members of the Hungarian Academy of Sciences
Burials at Esztergom Basilica
Cardinals created by Pope Pius X
Roman Catholic bishops in Austria-Hungary
Hungarian Roman Catholic archbishops